A Federal Firearms License (FFL) is a license in the United States that enables an individual or a company to engage in a business pertaining to the manufacture or importation of firearms and ammunition, or the interstate and intrastate sale of firearms. Holding an FFL to engage in certain such activities has been a legal requirement within the United States since the enactment of the Gun Control Act of 1968. The FFL is issued by the Bureau of Alcohol, Tobacco, Firearms, and Explosives (BATFE, commonly known as the "ATF")

History
The Federal Firearms License was established to implement the Gun Control Act of 1968. The 1968 act was an update or revision of the Federal Firearms Act of 1938 (FFA), which required all manufacturers and dealers of firearms who ship or receive firearms or ammunition in interstate or foreign commerce to have a license, and forbade them from transferring any firearm or most ammunition to any person interstate unless certain conditions were met. As a practical matter, this did not affect the interstate commerce in firearms or ammunition, because the 1938 FFA lacked a provision specifically restricting "prohibited purchasers" as defined in the FFA from purchasing firearms under false pretenses/documentation (i.e. those who would otherwise have been considered "prohibited purchasers" were still able to get away with firearms purchases by providing falsified identity information; since background checks as understood today did not yet exist, convicted felons and other "prohibited purchasers" would still buy firearms unhindered by using fake identification). It was with the adoption of the Gun Control Act (GCA) in 1968, which repealed most of the FFA, that the lawful interstate trade of firearms was limited almost entirely to persons holding a Federal Firearms License in the United States. As background checks were available by this time, enforcement of the GCA via the bottleneck provided by background checks and the FFL requirement was more effective than that of the FFA.

Types

Special Occupational Tax Classes
Certain types of firearms, accessories and other weapons are currently restricted under the National Firearms Act (NFA). In addition to a current FFL (of whatever "type" is applicable), the ATF requires that business owners who are planning to import, manufacture or deal in restricted materials also pay a Special Occupational Tax, or "SOT" (thereby making the business owner a "Special Occupational Taxpayer").

 Class 1 SOT status requires an importer FFL, either Type 8 or 11.
 Class 2 SOT status requires a manufacturer FFL, either Type 7 or 10.
 Class 3 SOT status requires a dealer FFL, either Type 1, 2, or 9.

Collectors of Curio and Relic (C&R) Firearms

C&R firearms are defined in Title 27, Code of Federal Regulations, Part 478.11 as those "of special interest to collectors by reason of some quality other than is associated with firearms intended for sporting use or as offensive or defensive weapons." To be recognized by ATF as a C&R firearm, a firearm must fall into at least one of the following three categories:

 Firearms manufactured more than 50 years prior to the current date, not including replicas
 Firearms certified by the curator of a municipal, state, or federal museum that exhibits firearms as curios or relics of museum interest
 Any other firearms that derive a substantial part of their monetary value from the fact that they are novel, rare, bizarre, or because of their association with some historical figure, period, or event. Proof of qualification of a particular firearm under this category requires evidence of present value and evidence that like firearms are not available except as collector's items, or that the value of like firearms available in ordinary commercial channels is substantially less.

This includes most firearms used by the warring nations in World War I and World War II. However, the firearm must normally also be in its original configuration to retain the C&R designation. So, for example, an unaltered Mauser Karabiner 98k rifle used by the German Army in World War II is a C&R firearm – but the same rifle "sporterized" with new stock and finish is generally not considered a C&R firearm. There is an ambiguous point in how the license is currently administered, in that some firearms altered by the militaries that issued them have been confirmed by the ATF to retain C&R status, though whether this applies to all such conversions (the examples given by the ATF were the Spanish M1916 Guardia Civil, FR-7, and FR-8 Mausers) also remains ambiguous. However, as long as the receiver (the part of the firearm that is regulated by the ATF) is over 50 years old, the firearm qualifies as a Curio & Relic – ATF states explicitly that, in addition to newer firearms it individually approves, firearms automatically achieve C&R status upon turning 50, provided they are in the original configuration. If modified significantly, the 50-year clock resets to the date of modification. (Specific examples are available in the ATF FAQs.) Certain automatic firearms have been designated as C&R firearms, and a C&R may be used to acquire these as well.

Collectors may acquire C&R firearms in interstate commerce, e.g., via mail or phone order or the Internet, or in person. (This is especially important for collectors of pistols and revolvers since they may not otherwise be acquired outside a collector's state of residence.) Collectors are not considered to be FFL dealers and have no special privileges concerning non-C&R firearms, nor may they "engage in the business" of regularly selling C&R firearms to persons who do not have an FFL. Selling of C&R firearms does not require an FFL transfer across state lines, only if the firearm has a collectible status. The purpose of the C&R license is to enable a collector to acquire C&R firearms for their personal collection and not to become a firearms dealer.

Curio & Relic Compliance Inspections
(D) At the election of a licensed collector, the annual inspection of records and inventory permitted under this paragraph shall be performed at the office of the Attorney General designed for such inspections which is located in closest proximity to the premises where the inventory and records of such licensed collector are maintained.
 —ATF 2005 Regulations page 18. (ATF Publication 5300.4)

Conversion of C&R firearms
Any firearm sold as a C&R firearm once changed out of its original configuration cannot be resold as a C&R firearm.
In regard to conversions; certain pistols have been approved for sale with added safety conversions (i.e. Polish and Romanian Tokarev pistols,   to which a manual safety was added to meet import requirements). Certain other modifications, such as period sporterisations, are arguably C&R qualified as they represent the gun culture of the period. An example would be a Lee–Enfield or 98K Mauser military rifle that had been converted into a continental style sporter before World War II. These common conversions occurred more than 50 years ago, and represent a sub-type of special interest to collectors.

Antiques
Federal law defines guns manufactured in or before 1898 with unconventional firing mechanisms (such as percussion, flintlock and other combustion methods typically considered "black powder"), or cartridge firearms that have uncommon and not readily available ammo types (.30-40 Krag, .30 Mauser, .44 Russian, etc) as "antique" (26 USC §5845(G)), (27 CFR §478.11) and they are generally unregulated in federal law. They may be bought and sold across state lines without an FFL. The only exceptions are short-barreled rifles, short barreled shotguns, and machine guns, which are regulated under the National Firearms Act of 1934. Unlike C&R guns, antique guns can be re-arsenalized, sporterized, re-barreled, or re-chambered, yet they will still retain their federally exempt status. Even if every part except the receiver is replaced, a pre-1899 "black powder" firearm still qualifies as an antique. FFL holders have been directed not to enter Pre-1899 guns into their Bound Books.

Record keeping
FFL holders are required to keep a registry of firearms sales in an ATF-approved Bound Book, or a computerized equivalent using ATF-approved software. Licensed dealers must also maintain file copies of Form 4473 or eForm 4473 "Firearms Transaction Record" documents, for a period of not less than 20 years after the date of sale or disposition. When retiring or otherwise relinquishing a license, these records are sent to the ATF's out-of-business Records Center. Licensed collectors are not required to send their records to the ATF when relinquishing their license. The ATF is allowed to inspect, as well as request a copy of the Form 4473 from the dealer during the course of a criminal investigation. In addition, the sale of two or more handguns to a person in a five business day period must be reported to ATF on Form 3310.4.

Conditions of application

ATF will approve the application if the applicant:

 Is 21 years or older.
 Is not prohibited from handling or possessing firearms or ammunition
 Has not violated the Gun Control Act or its regulations
 Has not failed to disclose information or facts in connection with his application
 Has premises for conducting business or collecting

The applicant must also certify that:

 The business to be conducted under the license is not prohibited by State or local law in the place where the licensed premise is located including Local (City & County) Zoning Ordinances and not prohibited by the Home Owners Association (HOA) if any.
Within 30 days after the application is approved the business will comply with the requirements of State and local law applicable to the conduct of the business
The business will not be conducted under the license until the requirements of State and local law applicable to the business have been met
The applicant has sent or delivered a form to the chief law enforcement officer where the premises are located notifying the officer that the applicant intends to apply for a license.
Secure gun storage and safety devices will be available at any place in which firearms are sold under the license to persons who are not licensees

Application fees
See TITLE 27 CFR, CHAPTER II, PART 478 – COMMERCE IN FIREARMS AND AMMUNITION, § 478.42 License fees.

Non-destructive devices

Destructive Device

Ammunition

Importers and manufacturers of machine guns, short-barreled rifles and shotguns, and destructive devices must also pay a special occupational tax of $500 per year if gross revenues do not exceed $500,000, and $1,000 if revenues exceed $500,000.

International Traffic in Arms Regulations Registration

International Traffic in Arms Regulations (ITAR) is a set of United States government regulations that control the manufacture, export, import, or transfer of defense-related articles and services on the United States Munitions List (USML), which includes most all firearms components.

In general, the Department of State's Directorate of Defense Trade Controls (DDTC), which interprets and enforces ITAR, requires anyone engaged in such activities, including holders of a Federal Firearms License, to register annually and submit a fee (no less than $2,250 as of 2013). Registration exemptions exist for, among other things, work on unclassified intellectual property, and work or fabrication of an experimental or scientific nature including research and development. As of January 23, 2020, new regulations regarding ITAR are in the works.

See also
Arms trafficking
Bureau of Alcohol, Tobacco, Firearms, and Explosives (ATF)
Firearm Owners Protection Act (1986)
Form 4473
Gun Control Act of 1968
Gun law in the United States
Gun show loophole
Gun shows in the United States
Straw purchase

References

External links
Form order form to order F 7CR new form Curio/Relic FFL03 license
FFLeZCheck system for verifying FFL validity 
NRA-ILA Factsheets: Federal Firearms License
Requirements for Electronic Acquisition & Disposition Records

United States federal firearms law
Gun politics in the United States